These are the results of the men's individual pursuit at the 1976 Summer Olympics in Montreal, Quebec, Canada, held from 20 to 22 July 1976. There were a total number of 27 participants in the Olympic Vélodrome.

Competition format

The individual pursuit competition consisted of a qualifying round and a 4-round knockout tournament (increased from three rounds in previous Games), including a bronze medal race. Each race, in both the qualifying round and the knock-out rounds, consisted of a pair of cyclists starting from opposite sides of the track. The cyclists raced for 4,000 metres, attempting to finish with the fastest time and, if possible, catch the other cyclist. For the qualifying round, the 16 fastest times overall (regardless of whether the cyclist finished first or second in his heat, though any cyclist who was overtaken was eliminated) earned advancement to the knockout rounds. In the knockout rounds, the winner of each heat advanced to the next round.

Results

Qualifying round

1/8 finals

1/8 final 1

1/8 final 2

1/8 final 3

1/8 final 4

1/8 final 5

1/8 final 6

1/8 final 7

1/8 final 8

Quarterfinals

Quarterfinal 1

Quarterfinal 2

Quarterfinal 3

Quarterfinal 4

Semifinals

Semifinal 1

Semifinal 2

Finals

Bronze medal match

Final

Final classification

References

External links
 Official Report

P
Cycling at the Summer Olympics – Men's individual pursuit
Track cycling at the 1976 Summer Olympics